Akkol meaning "White Lake", may refer to

Akkol, a town in northern Kazakhstan, former Alexeyevka 
Akkol, Zerendi District, a village in the Akmola Region, Kazakhstan
Akkol, Talas District, a village in the Zhambyl Region, Kazakhstan
Akkol District, Kazakhstan
Akkol', Aktobe, a town in western Kazakhstan 
Akkol (lake), a lake in the Kostanay Region, Kazakhstan
Lake Akkol, a lake in the Zhambyl Region, Kazakhstan